Gaintxurizketa is a railway station in Lezo, Basque Country, Spain. It is owned by Euskal Trenbide Sarea and operated by Euskotren. It lies on the San Sebastián-Hendaye railway, popularly known as the Topo line.

History 
The station opened in 1912 as part of the San Sebastián-Hendaye railway. The station is located next to the Madrid-Hendaye railway, which has a closed station of the same name adjacent to the Euskotren station.

Services 
The station is served by Euskotren Trena line E2. It runs every 15 minutes during weekdays and weekend afternoons, and every 30 minutes on weekend mornings.

References 

Euskotren Trena stations
Railway stations in Gipuzkoa
Railway stations in Spain opened in 1912